North, South, East....Wess is an album by saxophonist Frank Wess recorded in 1956 and released on the Savoy label.

Reception

Allmusic reviewer by Jim Todd stated, "This easygoing swing date is essentially a small group drawn from the Count Basie band of the day. The two tenors, Wess and Frank Foster, and two trombones, Bennie Powell and Henry Coker, all from the Count's band, keep the sound comfortably cruising near the middle register ... The best moments come when Wess switches to flute, the instrument on which he does have a distinctive and appealing musical personality".

Track listing 
All compositions by Frank Wess except where noted
 "What'd Ya Say" (Ozzie Cadena) – 9:41
 "Dill Pickles" (Frank Foster) – 6:08
 "Dancing on the Ceiling" (Richard Rodgers, Lorenz Hart) – 3:45	
 "Hard Sock Dance" – 7:42
 "Salvation" – 3:51
 "Lazy Sal" (Henry Coker) – 6:10
Recorded at Van Gelder Studio, Hackensack, NJ on March 5, 1956 (tracks 2–4) and March 7, 1956 (tracks 1, 5 & 6)

Personnel 
Frank Wess – tenor saxophone, flute
Frank Foster – tenor saxophone
Henry Coker, Benny Powell – trombone
Kenny Burrell – guitar
Eddie Jones - bass
Kenny Clarke - drums

References 

Frank Wess albums
1956 albums
Savoy Records albums
Albums produced by Ozzie Cadena
Albums recorded at Van Gelder Studio